Korji may refer to:
 Korji, Mazandaran